Zager may refer to:

Bruce B. Zager (born 1952), American justice of the Iowa Supreme Court 
Michael Zager (born 1943), American record producer
Zager, Iran, a village in Ardabil Province, Iran

See also
 Bert Zagers (1933–1992), American football player who played halfback and defensive back
 Zager and Evans, a US rock-pop duo of the late 1960s and early 1970s